Alessandro Spezialetti (born 14 January 1975 in Lachen, Switzerland) is an Italian former professional road bicycle racer, who competed professionally between 1997 and 2012. He was known as a lieutenant, or top domestique in Grand Tours.

Palmares 

 Giro d'Abruzzo – 1 stage (2001)

References

External links

Profile from L.P.R. Brakes official website

Italian male cyclists
1975 births
Living people
Sportspeople from the canton of Schwyz